The N3 road is one of the national highways of Gabon. It connects to the east of the country along the centre.
Towns located along the highway include: 

Alembe
Kazamabika
Lastoursville
Moanda 
Franceville

National highways in Gabon